Sergey Manassarian (born 25 February 1959 in Yerevan, Armenia) is an Armenian politician and diplomat.  Manassarian is the Armenian  Deputy Minister of Foreign Affairs.

Education 

Manassarian graduated from the faculty of mechanics of Yerevan Agricultural Institute in 1981.

Candidate of technical sciences.

Professional Experience 

In 1981-1988 worked at the Research Institute of Automation of Agriculture.

In 1988 – State plan, then – in the Ministry of Economy as the assistant of the deputy Prime-Minister. Then, Sergey Manassaryan was the assistant of the Prime-Minister of Armenia, the Head of the administration of Prime-Minister, secretary of the Government-Minister.

1996 – MFA of Armenia, Deputy Minister of Foreign Affairs.

1999-2005 – was the Ambassador of Armenia to the Arab Republic of Egypt. Concurrently, the Ambassador of Armenia to Morocco, Libya, Ethiopia, Sudan and Oman.

2005-2010 – Ambassador of Armenia to Bulgaria.

Diplomatic rank 		
Ambassador Extraordinary and Plenipotentiary

Awards 
Decorated with Bulgaria’s highest honor - "Stara Planina" medal.

Personal life 

Married, has two daughters.

References 

 Official website of MFA RA
 Interview of Deputy Foreign Minister Sergey Manasaryan to Mediamax
 Tert.am
 Panarmenian.net

Diplomats from Yerevan
Living people
1959 births
Politicians from Yerevan
Ambassadors of Armenia to Egypt
Ambassadors of Armenia to Morocco
Ambassadors of Armenia to Libya
Ambassadors of Armenia to Ethiopia
Ambassadors of Armenia to Sudan
Ambassadors of Armenia to Oman
Ambassadors of Armenia to Bulgaria